Matthew Watson  (born 2 December 1976) is a former Australian rules footballer who played with Essendon in the Australian Football League (AFL).

Watson was a ruckman, who came to Essendon from Warragul, via the Gippsland Power in the TAC Cup. He played his only senior AFL game in round 21 of the 1997 AFL season, when Essendon defeated the Brisbane Lions at the Gabba. Watson had eight disposals.

References

1976 births
Australian rules footballers from Victoria (Australia)
Essendon Football Club players
Gippsland Power players
Warragul Football Club players
Living people